Molly Cesanek (born March 2, 2001) is an American ice dancer. With her skating partner, Yehor Yehorov, she is the 2021 Lake Placid Ice Dance International bronze medalist and has competed on the Grand Prix series.

Personal life
Cesanek was born in Manassas, Virginia, and was raised in Warrenton, Virginia. She began taking ballet lessons at age three. After graduating in 2019 from Wakefield School, she began studying health promotion at American University.

Career

Early years 
Cesanek began learning to skate as a five-year-old. At age 11 or 12, she took up solo ice dancing and met her first partner. With Maxwell Gart, she won silver in the juvenile competition at the 2014 U.S. Championships and bronze in the intermediate category at the 2015 U.S. Championships. She then skated one season with Edward Jahoda, placing fifth in the novice event at the 2016 U.S. Championships.

Later in 2016, Cesanek formed a partnership with Nikolay Usanov. The two would finish 7th in novice ice dancing at the 2017 U.S. Championships and 12th as juniors at the 2018 U.S. Championships.

Partnership with Yehorov 
Cesanek teamed up with Ukraine's Yehor Yehorov in April 2018. During the first two seasons of their partnership, they trained at the Rockville Ice Arena in Maryland. In their first season, they placed 5th in the junior event at the 2019 U.S. Championships. Ukraine then released him to compete internationally for the United States.

Continuing in juniors the following season, Cesanek/Yehorov took bronze at the Lake Placid Ice Dance International and received two ISU Junior Grand Prix assignments, finishing 6th at both. They were awarded the pewter medal for fourth place at the 2020 U.S. Championships and won gold at the Egna Dance Trophy in February. 

Ahead of the 2020–21 season, their first in the senior ranks, Cesanek/Yehorov switched to the Ion International Training Center in Leesburg, Virginia but kept the same coaching team. The duo resumed on-ice training in June after three months away due to COVID-related closures. In October, they finished 5th at the 2020 Skate America, a Grand Prix event which, due to COVID, was limited to American and U.S.-based skaters. They were also 5th at the 2021 U.S. Championships.

In August 2021, Cesanek/Yehorov won bronze at the Lake Placid Ice Dance International. After finishing 13th at the 2021 CS Lombardia Trophy and 9th at the 2021 Skate America, they placed 6th at the 2021 CS Golden Spin of Zagreb.

Programs

With Yehorov

With Usanov

Competitive highlights 
GP: Grand Prix; CS: Challenger Series; JGP: Junior Grand Prix

With Yehorov

With Usanov

With Jahoda

With Gart 

Levels: V = Juvenile; I = Intermediate; N = Novice; J = Junior

References

External links 
 

2001 births
American female ice dancers
Living people
People from Manassas, Virginia